NECTA may refer to:
 New England city and town area, a geographic and statistical entity in the United States
National Examinations Council of Tanzania, the board which manages the Certificate of Secondary Education Examination